Nurhaci (14 May 1559 – 30 September 1626), also known by his temple name as the Emperor Taizu of Qing, was a Jurchen chieftain who rose to prominence in the late 16th century in Manchuria. A member of the House of Aisin-Gioro, he reigned as the founding khan of the Later Jin dynasty of China from 1616 to 1626.

Nurhaci reorganized and united various Jurchen tribes (the later "Manchu"), consolidated the Eight Banners military system, and eventually launched attacks on both the Ming and Joseon dynasties. His conquest of Ming dynasty's northeastern Liaodong region laid the groundwork for the Qing conquest of the Ming by his descendants, who founded the Qing dynasty in 1636. He is also generally credited with ordering the creation of a new written script for the Manchu language based on the Mongolian vertical script.

Name and titles
Some suggest that the meaning of the name in the Manchu language is "the skin of a wild boar", other explanation is "brave person like wild boar". Regarded as the founding father of the Qing dynasty, he is given the customary temple name of Taizu, which is traditionally assigned to founders of dynasties. His name is also alternatively spelled Nurgaci, Nurhachi, or Nu-er-ha-chi (the last of these simply the transcription of the Chinese characters used to write his name).

Nurhaci was the last chieftain of the Jianzhou Jurchens and first khan of the Later Jin dynasty. His title in Manchu as khan was  Geren gurun-be ujire genggiyen han ("brilliant khan who benefits all nations"). His era name was Tianming (Manchu:Abkai Fulingga), in Mongolian Тэнгэрийн сүлдэт Tengri-yin Süldetü. It means "Heaven's Mandate." He was given a posthumous name in 1736 (see infobox), the shortened form of which was "Emperor Gao" , Manchu:Dergi Hūwangdi)

Early life
Nurhaci was born in 1559. Being a member of the Gioro clan of the Suksuhu River tribe, Nurhaci also claimed descent from Mentemu, a Jurchen headman who lived some two centuries earlier. The young man grew up as a soldier in the household of the Ming dynasty general Li Chengliang in Fushun, where he learned Mandarin Chinese, the official language of the courts. Nurhaci read the Chinese novels Romance of the Three Kingdoms and Water Margin learning all he knew about Chinese military and political strategies from them. He named his clan Aisin Gioro around 1612, when he formally ascended the throne as the Khan of the Later Jin dynasty. 

Nurhaci's grandfather Giocangga was a chieftain of the Jurchens in Hetu Ala who enjoyed the patronage of Li. He frequented the Fushun market as official delegation leader, and accompanied Li to Beijing at least once. In 1582, Nikan Wailan, a rival Jurchen chief, led Ming forces to attack the Fort Gure (古勒城, now in Xinbin County). Giocangga feared for his granddaughter who was married to Atai, the town's chief. He rushed into the city, taking Nurhaci's father Taksi with him. During the ensuing battle, both Giocangga and Taksi were killed.

Nurhaci sought revenge against Nikan Wailan for the deaths of his father and grandfather. The Ming returned his father's remains, grant him trade patents, and recognized him as the successor of Giocangga. However, Nurhaci's demand that they hand over Nikan Wailan was refused. Nurhaci therefore started to expand his own power, starting only from thirteen sets of armor inherited from his father. In 1584, he attacked Nikan Wailan at Turun. Nikan Wailan fled away to Erhun, which Nurhaci attacked again in 1587. Nikan Wailan this time fled to Li Chengliang's territory. Li relented and gave Nikan Wailan over to Nurhaci, who beheaded Nikan Wailan immediately. 

Nurhaci gradually grew his strength in the following years and subdued the core Jianzhou Jurchen tribes and towns from 1583 to 1588. At the same time, Nurhaci still considered himself a representative of imperial Ming power. He received the title of assistant commissioner-in chief in 1589 and the honor of "dragon-tiger general" in 1595. From 1590 onward, he led multiple tributary missions to Beijing.

Unifying the Jurchen tribes

In 1593, the Yehe called upon a coalition of nine tribes: the Hada, Ula, Hoifa, Khorchin Mongols, Sibe, Guwalca, Jušeri, Neyen, and the Yehe themselves to attack the Jianzhou Jurchens. The coalition was defeated at the Battle of Gure and Nurhaci emerged victorious.

From 1599 to 1618, Nurhaci set out on a campaign against the four Hulun tribes. He began by attacking the Hada in 1599 and conquering them in 1603. Then in 1607, Hoifa was also conquered with the death of its beile Baindari, followed by an expedition against Ula and its beile Bujantai in 1613, and finally the Yehe and its beile Gintaisi at the Battle of Sarhu in 1619. As Nurhaci's power expanded, the relationship with the Ming also became increasingly strained. In 1608, Ming subjects were prohibited from cultivating the land or gathering ginseng, one of the main Jurchen export products, within Nurhaci's boundary.

In 1599, Nurhaci gave two of his translators, Erdeni Baksi ('Jewel Teacher' in Mongolian) and Dahai Jargūci,<ref>Matsumura Jun, p.131 A Re-examinations of the Story of the Founding of the Ch'ing Dynasty 『清朝開国説話再考』(in Japanese)</ref> the task of creating a Manchu alphabet by adapting the Mongolian script. Dahai was described with his origin from the Liao valley and his ethnicity as Han Chinese in the Korean book "Nanjung chamnok; Sok chamnok" (亂中雜錄) by Cho Kyŏng-nam (趙慶南) (1570-1641) a Korean official and scholar, contradicting Qing texts which says his clan is Giolca. The Qing texts said Dahau's family lived near Fushun in the Giolca region.

In 1606, he was granted the title of Kundulun Khan by the Mongols.

In 1616, Nurhaci declared himself Khan and founded the Jin dynasty (aisin gurun), often called the Later Jin in reference to the legacy of the earlier Jurchen Jin dynasty of the 12th century. The "Later Jin" was renamed to "Qing" by his son Hong Taiji after his death in 1626, however Nurhaci is usually referred to as the founder of the Qing dynasty.

In order to help with the newly organized administration, five of his trusted companions were appointed as his chief councilors, Anfiyanggū, Eidu, Hūrhan, Fiongdon, and Hohori.

Only after he became Khan did he finally unify the Ula (clan of his consort Lady Abahai, mentioned below) and the Yehe, the clan of his consort Monggo Jerjer.

Nurhaci chose to variously emphasize either differences or similarities in lifestyles with other peoples like the Mongols for political reasons. Nurhaci said to the Mongols that "The languages of the Chinese and Koreans are different, but their clothing and way of life is the same. It is the same with us Manchus (Jurchen) and Mongols. Our languages are different, but our clothing and way of life is the same." Later Nurhaci indicated that the bond with the Mongols was not based in any real shared culture, rather it was for pragmatic reasons of "mutual opportunism", when he said to the Mongols: "You Mongols raise livestock, eat meat and wear pelts. My people till the fields and live on grain. We two are not one country and we have different languages."

When the Jurchens were reorganized by Nurhaci into the Eight Banners, many Manchu clans were artificially created as a group of unrelated people founded a new Manchu clan (mukun) using a geographic origin name such as a toponym for their hala (clan name). The irregularities over Jurchen and Manchu clan origin led to the Qing trying to document and systematize the creation of histories for Manchu clans, including manufacturing an entire legend around the origin of the Aisin Gioro clan by taking mythology from the northeast.

Invasion of Ming dynasty

In 1618, Nurhaci commissioned a document titled the Seven Grievances in which he enumerated seven problems with Ming rule and began to rebel against the domination of the Ming dynasty. A majority of the grievances dealt with conflicts against Yehe, and Ming favouritism of Yehe.

Nurhaci led many successful engagements against the Ming dynasty, the Northern Yuan dynasty, the Joseon dynasty, and other Jurchen clans, greatly enlarging the territory under his control.

The first capitals of the Later Jin dynasty established by Nurhaci were Fe Ala and Hetu Ala. Many ethnic Han participated in the construction of Hetu Ala.

Defectors from the Ming side played a massive role in the Qing conquest of the Ming. Ming generals who defected to the Manchus were often married to women from the Aisin Gioro clan while lower-ranked defectors were given non-imperial Manchu women as wives. Nurhaci arranged for a marriage between one of his granddaughters and the Ming general Li Yongfang (李永芳) after Li surrendered Fushun in Liaoning to the Manchus in 1618 as the result of the Battle of Fushun. His son Abatai's daughter was married to Li Yongfang. The offspring of Li received the "Third Class Viscount" title. Li Yongfang was the great-great-great-grandfather of Li Shiyao (李侍堯).

The Han prisoner of war Gong Zhenglu (Onoi) was appointed to instruct Nurhaci's sons and received gifts of slaves, wives, and a domicile from Nurhaci after Nurhaci rejected offers of payment to release him back to his relatives.

Nurhaci had treated Han in Liaodong differently according to how much grain they had, those with less than 5 to 7 sin were treated poorly while those with more than that amount were rewarded with property. Due to a revolt by Han in Liaodong in 1623, Nurhachi, who previously gave concessions to conquered Han subjects in Liaodong, turned against them and ordered that they no longer be trusted and enacted discriminatory policies and killings against them, while ordering that Han who assimilated to the Jurchen (in Jilin) before 1619 be treated equally as Jurchens were and not like the conquered Han in Liaodong.

By May 1621, Nurhaci had conquered the cities of Liaoyang and Shenyang. In April 1625, he designated Shenyang the new capital city, which would hold that status until the Qing conquest of the Ming in 1644.

Death and legacy

In 1626, Nurhaci was defeated by Ming general Yuan Chonghuan at the Battle of Ningyuan, in what was the first serious military defeat of his life. During this battle, Nurhaci was wounded by Portuguese-manufactured cannons in Yuan's army. Unable to recover either physically or mentally, Nurhaci died of his wounds two days later in Aijipu (靉雞堡; present-day Da'aijinpu Village, Dijia Township, Yuhong District, Shenyang) on 30 September 1626, at the age of 67. His tomb, Fu Mausoleum, is located east of Shenyang.

Among the most lasting contributions Nurhaci left his descendants was the establishment of the Eight Banners, which would eventually form the backbone of the military that dominated the Qing Empire. The status of Banners did not change much over the course of Nurhaci's lifetime, nor in subsequent reigns, remaining mostly under the control of the royal family. The two elite Yellow Banners were consistently under Nurhaci's control. The two Blue Banners were controlled by Nurhaci's brother Šurhaci until he died, at which point the Blue Banners were given to Šurhaci's two sons, Chiurhala and Amin. Nurhaci's eldest son, Cuyen, controlled the White Banner for most of his father's reign until he rebelled. Then the Bordered White Banner was given to Nurhaci's grandson and the Plain White was given to his eighth son and heir, Hong Taiji. However, by the end of Nurhaci's reign, Hong Taiji controlled both White Banners. Finally, the Red Banner was run by Nurhaci's second son Daišan. Later in Nurhaci's reign, the Bordered Red Banner was handed down to his son. Daišan and his son would continue holding the two Red Banners well into the end of Hong Taiji's reign.

The details of Hong Taiji's succession as the Khan of the Later Jin dynasty are unclear. When he died in late 1626, Nurhaci did not designate an heir; instead he encouraged his sons to rule collegially. Three of his sons and a nephew were the "four senior beiles": Daišan (43 years old), Amin (son of Nurhaci's brother Šurhaci; 40 or 41), Manggūltai (38 or 39), and Hong Taiji himself (33). On the day after Nurhaci's death, they coerced his primary consort Lady Abahai (1590–1626) – who had borne him three sons: Ajige, Dorgon, and Dodo – to commit suicide to accompany him in death. This gesture has made some historians suspect that Nurhaci had in fact named the fifteen-year-old Dorgon as a successor, with Daišan as regent. By forcing Dorgon's mother to kill herself, the princes removed a strong base of support for Dorgon. The reason such intrigue was necessary is that Nurhaci had left the two elite Yellow Banners to Dorgon and Dodo, who were the sons of Lady Abahai. Hong Taiji exchanged control of his two White Banners for that of the two Yellow Banners, shifting their influence and power from his young brothers onto himself.

According to Hong Taiji's later recollections, Amin and the other beile were willing to accept Hong Taiji as Khan, but Amin then would have wanted to leave with his Bordered Blue Banner, threatening to dissolve Nurhaci's unification of the Jurchens. Eventually the older Daišan worked out a compromise that allowed Hong Taiji as the Khan, but almost equal to the other three senior beiles. Hong Taiji would eventually find ways to become the undisputed leader.

The change of the name from Jurchen to Manchu by Hong Taiji was made to hide the fact that the ancestors of the Manchus, the Jianzhou Jurchens, were ruled by the Chinese. The Qing dynasty carefully hid the two original editions of the books of "Qing Taizu Wu Huangdi Shilu" and the "Manzhou Shilu Tu" (Taizu Shihlu Tu) in the Qing palace, forbidden from public view because they showed that the Manchu Aisin Gioro family had been ruled by the Ming dynasty. In the Ming period, the Koreans of Joseon referred to the Jurchen-inhabited lands north of the Korean peninsula, above the rivers Yalu and Tumen, as part of Ming China, which they called the "superior country" (sangguk).

 Translations of Chinese Texts 
The first Manchu translations of Chinese works were the Six Secret Teachings, Sushu 素書, and Three Strategies of Huang Shigong, all Chinese military texts dedicated to the arts of war due to the Manchu interests in the topic, like Sun-Tzu's work The Art of War. The military related texts which were translated into Manchu from Chinese were translated by Dahai.

Manchu translations of Chinese texts included the Ming penal code and military texts were performed by Dahai. These translations were requested of Dahai by Nurhaci. The military text Wuzi was translated into Manchu along with The Art of War.

Chinese history, Chinese law, and Chinese military theory classical texts were translated into Manchu during the rule of Hong Taiji in Mukden (now Shenyang), with the Manchus placing significance upon military and governance related Chinese texts. A Manchu translation was made of the military-themed novel Romance of the Three Kingdoms. Chinese literature, military theory and legal texts were translated into Manchu by Dahai and Erdeni. The translations were ordered in 1629.

The translation of the military texts Sushu and Three Strategies of Huang Shigong, and the Da Ming Huidian done by Dahai was ordered by Nurhaci. While it was mainly administrative and ethical guidance which made up most of the Three Strategies of Huang Shigong and the Sushu, military science was indeed found in the Six Secret Teachings and Chinese military manuals were eagerly translated by the Manchus. They were also attracted to the military content in Romance of the Three Kingdoms, which is why it was translated. The Art of War was translated into Manchu as  Abkai: qoohai baita be gisurengge, Möllendorff: coohai baita be gisurengge, Discourse on the art of War. Another later Manchu translation was made by Aisin Gioro Qiying.

Primary sources
Information concerning Nurhaci can be found in later, propagandistic works such as the Manchu Veritable Records (Manchu:, Möllendorff: manju-i yargiyan kooli). Good contemporary sources are also available. For instance, much material concerning Nurhaci's rise is preserved within Korean sources such as the Veritable Records of the Joseon Dynasty, especially the Seonjo Sillok and the Gwanghaegun Ilgi. Indeed, the record of Sin Chung-il's trip to Jianzhou is preserved in the Seonjo Sillok.

The Jiu Manzhou Dang from Nurhaci's reign also survives. A revised transcription of these records (with the dots and circles added to the script) was commissioned by the Qianlong Emperor. This has been translated into Japanese under the title Manbun roto, and Chinese, under the title Manwen Laodang. A project is currently under way at Harvard University to translate them into English, as The Old Manchu Chronicles.

Physical appearance

According to the account of Korean ambassadors, Nurhaci was a physically strong man with a long and stern-looking face and a big, straight nose. Like most of the other Manchu men, he shaved most of his facial hair and kept only his moustache.

 Family 
Primary Consort

 Consort Yuan, of the Tunggiya clan (元妃 佟佳氏; 1560–1592), personal name Hahana Jacing (哈哈納扎青)
 Princess Duanzhuang of the First Rank (端莊固倫公主; 8 April 1578 – August/September 1652), personal name Nenzhe (嫩哲), first daughter
 Married Hohori (何和禮; 1561–1624) of the Manchu Donggo clan in 1588 and had issue ( two sons)
 Cuyen, Crown Prince (皇太子 褚英; 1580 – 14 October 1615), first son
 Daišan, Prince Lilie of the First Rank (禮烈親王 代善; 19 August 1583 – 25 November 1648), second son

 Consort Ji, of the Fuca clan (繼妃 富察氏; d. 1620), personal name Gundei (袞代)
 Manggūltai, Prince of the Third Rank (貝勒 莽古爾泰; 1587 – 11 January 1633), fifth son
 Third daughter (1590 – January/February 1636), personal name Mangguji (莽古濟)
 Married Urgūdai (吳爾古代) of the Manchu Hada Nara clan in February/March 1601
 Married Sodnom Dügüreng (索諾木杜棱; d. 1644) of the Aohan Borjigit clan in 1627
 Degelei, Prince of the Third Rank (貝勒 德格類; 10 January 1597 – 11 November 1635), tenth son

 Empress Xiaocigao, of the Yehe Nara clan (孝慈高皇后 葉赫那拉氏; 1575 – 31 October 1603), personal name Monggo Jerjer (孟古哲哲)
 Hong Taiji, Taizong (太宗 皇太極; 28 November 1592 – 21 September 1643), eighth son

 Empress Xiaoliewu, of the Ula Nara clan (孝烈武皇后 烏拉那拉氏; 1590 – 1 October 1626), personal name Abahai (阿巴亥)
 Ajige, Prince Ying of the First Rank (英親王 阿濟格; 28 August 1605 – 28 November 1651), 12th son
 Dorgon, Prince Ruizhong of the First Rank (睿忠親王 多爾袞; 17 November 1612 – 31 December 1650), 14th son
 Dodo, Prince Yutong of the First Rank (豫通親王 多鐸; 2 April 1614 – 29 April 1649), 15th son

Secondary Consort

 Consort Shoukang, of the Khorchin Borjigit clan (壽康妃 博爾濟吉特氏; 1599 – 21 January 1666)
 Secondary consort, of the Hada Nara clan (側妃 哈達那拉氏), personal name Amin Jerjer (阿敏哲哲)
 Secondary consort, of the Irgen Gioro clan (側妃 伊爾根覺羅氏)
 Princess of the Second Rank (和碩公主; 1587 – August/September 1646), personal name Yanzhe (顏哲), second daughter
 Married Yilaka (伊拉喀)
 Married Darhan (達爾漢; 1590–1644) of the Manchu Gorolo (郭絡羅) clan
 Abatai, Prince Raoyumin of the First Rank (饒余敏親王 阿巴泰; 27 July 1589 – 10 May 1646), seventh son

 Secondary consort, of the Yehe Nara clan (側妃 葉赫那拉氏 ), personal name Nanakun (納納昆)
 Princess of the Second Rank (和碩公主; 28 December 1612 – March/April 1646), personal name Songgutu (松古圖), eighth daughter
 Married Gürbüshi (古爾布什; d. 1661) of the Khalkha Borjigit clan on 22 February 1625

 Secondary consort, of the Khorchin Borjigit clan (側妃 博爾濟吉特氏; d. March/April 1644)

Concubine

 Mistress, of the Joogiya clan (兆佳氏)
 Abai, Duke Qinmin of the First Rank (鎮國勤敏公 阿拜; 8 September 1585 – 14 March 1648), third son

 Mistress, of the Niohuru clan (鈕祜祿氏)
 Tanggūdai, General Kejie of the First Rank (鎮國克潔將軍 湯古代; 24 December 1585 – 3 November 1640), fourth son
 Tabai, Duke Quehou of the Second Rank (輔國愨厚公 塔拜; 2 April 1589 – 6 September 1639), sixth son

 Mistress, of the Giyamuhut Gioro clan (嘉穆瑚覺羅氏), personal name Zhenge (真哥)
 Babutai, Duke Kexi of the First Rank (鎮國恪僖公 巴布泰; 13 December 1592 – 27 February 1655), ninth son
 Princess of the Second Rank (和碩公主; 1595 – June/July 1659), personal name Mukushen (穆庫什), fourth daughter
 Married Bujantai (1575–1618) of the Manchu Ula Nara clan in 1608, and had issue (three sons)
 Married Eidu (1562–1621) of the Manchu Niohuru clan, and had issue (two sons including Ebilun, one daughter)
 Married Turgei (圖爾格; 1594–1645) of the Manchu Niohuru clan in 1621
 Babuhai, General of the First Rank (鎮國將軍 巴布海; 15 January 1597 – September/October 1643), 11th son
 Fifth daughter (1597–1613)
 Married Daki (達啟) of the Manchu Niohuru clan in 1608
 Sixth daughter (1600 – October/November 1646)
 Married Suna (蘇納; d. 1648) of the Manchu Yehe Nara clan in 1613, and had issue (Suksaha)

 Mistress, of the Irgen Gioro clan (伊爾根覺羅氏)
 Lady of the Third Rank (鄉君; 8 April 1604 – July/August 1685), seventh daughter
 Married Ezhayi (鄂札伊; d. 1641) of the Manchu Nara clan in November/December 1619

 Mistress, of the Sirin Gioro clan (西林覺羅氏)
 Laimbu, Duke Jiezhi of the Second Rank (輔國介直公 賴慕布; 26 January 1612 – 23 June 1646), 13th son

 Mistress, personal name Daiyinzha (代因扎)
 Fiyanggū (費揚果; October/November 1620 – 1640), 16th son

Ancestry

In popular culture
 In the opening scene of the 1984 film Indiana Jones and the Temple of Doom, Indiana Jones trades the remains of Nurhaci (contained in a small, ornate jade urn) for a diamond owned by Shanghai mobster Lao Che. In the film novelization Lao Che claimed to be a descendant of Nurhaci.
 The 2005 television series Taizu Mishi focused on the life of Nurhaci. He was portrayed by Steve Ma.
 Nurhaci was portrayed by Jing Gangshan in the 2017 television series Rule The World.Science
The genus Nurhachius'', a pterodactyloid pterosaur, is named after Nurhaci.

See also

 Chinese emperors family tree (late)
 Darughachi
 Li Chengliang
 Qing conquest of the Ming
 List of Buddha claimants

References

Sources

 
 .
 
 
 .
 
 
  In two volumes.
 

|-

1559 births
1626 deaths
17th-century Chinese monarchs
Creators of writing systems
People from Mudanjiang
Qing dynasty emperors
Founding monarchs